The  is an automobile nameplate used by the Japanese automaker Toyota since 1995 for several minivan models:

 XH10 series Toyota Granvia, a H100 series Toyota HiAce-based semi-bonneted van sold in Japan between 1995 and 2002
 H300 series Toyota HiAce, marketed as Granvia for the models sold in Taiwan, Australasia, Argentina, Southeast Asia, and the Middle East since 2019
 XL40 series Toyota Sienna, marketed as Granvia for the models produced by FAW Toyota in China since 2022

Granvia
Cars introduced in 1995